Odo is a name typically associated with historical figures from the Middle Ages and before. Odo is etymologically related to the names Otho and Otto, and to the French name Odon and modern version Eudes, and to the Italian names Ottone and Udo; all come from the Germanic word ot meaning "possessor of wealth".

Historical

Nobility 
 Odo the Great (died c. 735), Duke of Aquitaine
 Odo I, Count of Orléans (died 834)
 Odo I, Count of Troyes (died 871)
 Odo II, Count of Troyes (held the title in 876)
 Odo of France (860–898), King of the Franks
 Odo of Toulouse (died 918 or 919), Count of Toulouse
 Odo of Fézensac (died 985), Count of Fézensac
 Odo I, Count of Blois (950–996)
 Odo I, Margrave of the Saxon Ostmark (died 993)
 Odo II, Count of Blois (983–1037)
 Odo II, Margrave of the Saxon Ostmark (died 1046)
 Odo, Count of Dammartin (died after 1061)
 Odo, Count of Penthièvre (c. 999–1079), co-Duke of Brittany
 Odo I, Duke of Burgundy (1060–1102)
 Odo, Count of Champagne (c. 1040–1115)
 Odo II, Duke of Burgundy (1118–1162), Duke of Brittany
 Odo I, Viscount of Porhoët
 Odo II, Viscount of Porhoët (died after 1180)
 Odo II of Champlitte (died in 1204)

Clerics 
 Odo of Glanfeuil (abbot and hagiographer
 Odo I of Beauvais (died 881), West Frankish abbot and bishop
 Odo of Cluny (c. 878–942), Roman Catholic saint
 Odo of Arezzo, composer and theorist
 Odo (or Oda) of Canterbury (died 958), Archbishop of Canterbury
 Odo of Bayeux (died 1097), brother of William the Conqueror, Bishop of Bayeux and Earl of Kent
 Odo of Cambrai (1050–1113), Benedictine monk and bishop
 Odo of Urgell (died 1122), saint and bishop of Urgell
 Odo II of Beauvais (died 1144), bishop of Beauvais
 Odo de St Amand (1110–1179), Grand Master of the Knights Templar
 Odo of Deuil, 12th-century historian and crusader
 Odo of Canterbury (died 1200), saint and abbot of Battle
 Odo of Novara (c. 1105–1200), Carthusian monk
 Odo of Châteauroux (c. 1190–1273), French cardinal
 Odo of Cheriton (c. 1185–1246/47), Roman Catholic priest and fabulist
 Pope Martin V (1368–1431), born Odo or Oddone Colonna
 Odo O'Driscoll, bishop of Ross, Ireland (1473-1494)

Modern
 Odo Casel (1886–1948), also known as Johannes Casel, German Catholic theologian and monk 
 Odo Hirsch (born 1962), Australian author
 Odo Marquard (1928–2015), German philosopher
 Odo Reuter (1850–1913), Swedo-Finnish zoologist and poet
 Odo Russell, 1st Baron Ampthill (1829–1884), British diplomat

Fictional characters
 Odo (Star Trek), a shapeshifter in the science fiction series Star Trek: Deep Space Nine portrayed by René Auberjonois
 Odo Proudfoot, a cousin of Bilbo Baggins from the fantasy novel The Lord of the Rings
 Odo Stevens, an Army officer, journalist, and author from Anthony Powell's A Dance to the Music of Time novel sequence
 Odo, founder of an anarchist political movement in Ursula K. Le Guin's science fiction novel The Dispossessed and her short story "The Day Before the Revolution"
 Odo or Ooth, a name allegedly corrupted into Hood in the claim that Robert Fitzooth was Robin Hood
 Odo the Hero, a wizard first mentioned in Harry Potter and the Half-Blood Prince; Professors Hagrid and Slughorn sing a sad song about Odo dying when they get drunk after the spider Aragog's funeral. The song is again sung by Charlie Weasley, Hagrid and a squat wizard during Bill Weasley and Fleur Delacour's wedding in Harry Potter and the Deathly Hallows. "And Odo the hero, they bore him back home/ To the place that he'd known as a lad,/ They laid him to rest with his hat inside out/ And his wand snapped in two, which was sad."
 Odo the chimpanzee, in Yann Martel's The High Mountains of Portugal.

See also
Eudes (disambiguation)
Oda (disambiguation)